The Federación Colombiana de Atletismo (FECODATLE; Colombian Athletics Federation) is the governing body for the sport of athletics in Colombia.  Current president is Lino Varela.

History 
FECODATLE was founded and joined CONSUDATLE in 1937.

Affiliations 
FECODATLE is the national member federation for Colombia in the following international organisations:
World Athletics
Confederación Sudamericana de Atletismo (CONSUDATLE; South American Athletics Confederation)
Association of Panamerican Athletics (APA)
Asociación Iberoamericana de Atletismo (AIA; Ibero-American Athletics Association)
Central American and Caribbean Athletic Confederation (CACAC)
Moreover, it is part of the following national organisations:
Colombian Olympic Committee (Spanish: Comité Olímpico Colombiano)

Members 

FECODATLE comprises the regional athletic ligas of
30 of the 32 departments, plus the ligas of the capital district and of the
armed forces. There a no ligas for the departments of Vaupés
and Vichada.

Kit suppliers 
Colombia's kits are currently supplied by Nike.

National records 
FECODATLE maintains the Colombian records in athletics.

External links 
  (in Spanish)

References 

Colombia
Athletics
Sport in Colombia
National governing bodies for athletics
Sports organizations established in 1937